The May Days, sometimes also called May Events, refer to a series of clashes between 3 and 8 May 1937 during which factions on the Republican faction of the Spanish Civil War engaged one another in street battles in various parts of Catalonia, centered on the city of Barcelona.

In those events, libertarian socialist supporters of the Spanish Revolution, such as the anarchist CNT and the anti-Stalinist POUM, which opposed a centralized government, faced statists, such as the Republican government, Catalan government and the Communist Party of Spain, which believed in a strong central government.

The events were the culmination of the confrontation between prewar Republican legality and the Spanish Revolution, which had been in constant strife since the beginning of the Spanish Civil War.

Background 

After the failure of the pro-pushist military rebellion in Barcelona in July 1936, the city and then all of the rest of Catalonia had been under the control of the workers' militias, especially the anarchist trade union Confederación Nacional del Trabajo (CNT-FAI) and the socialist trade union Unión General de Trabajadores (UGT). Just after taking the last rebelling barracks, the anarchist leaders met with the President of the Generalitat de Catalunya Lluis Companys. It resulted in the Central Committee of Antifascist Militias of Catalonia being established, the de facto government of Barcelona and Catalonia. It represented most parties from the Front d'Esquerres (the name of the Popular Front in Catalonia). The Generalitat and the central government had lost all freedom of action and assisted passively in the revolution that was taking place in Catalonia and extended to Aragon. The industries were collectivized, but there was always the same problem when the petitions of loans to the banks (collectivized but under control of communists and the government) were denied because those industries were not being supervised by the Generalitat. In October, the committee dissolved itself, and its members became councilors of the government of the Generalitat of Catalonia. However, the Patrullas de Control ("Control Patrols", a revolutionary body that had a repressive character and in which CNT-FAI had a relative majority) continued their activities freely because of the inability of the Catalan government to control them.

The climate of distrust and confrontation was present not only among republican institutions and workers' organizations but also between those organizations, especially of anarchists toward socialists, communists and Catalan nationalists. Even among the communists, there was much division. The Communist Party of Spain (PCE) and the Unified Socialist Party of Catalonia (PSUC) followed the official doctrine of the Soviet Union and supported the separate handling of war and revolution and defending the Second Spanish Republic. The PCE was the major communist party in the country, but the PSUC was the main communist organization in Catalonia. At the other extreme, the anti-authoritarian Workers' Party of Marxist Unification (POUM) of former Right and Left Opposition radically opposed Joseph Stalin and supported carrying out the revolution while the war was raging; the anarchists agreed on that point with the POUM.

Tension was rising because chain of events that took place during the winter, heated the political climate and paved the way for what would take place later. The PCE's campaign against the POUM had begun in March during a political conference in Valencia. The POUM leaders were vilified and accused of being covert Nazi agents under a false revolutionary propaganda of being enemy agents infiltrated in the country. The POUM had come to propose an invitation for Leon Trotsky to reside in Catalonia, despite its differences with him. The POUM leaders were becoming increasingly wary during the spring of 1937. Tension in the streets of Barcelona was becoming evident of the arrival of a hot spring: the Patrullas de Control were led by José Asens and continued arbitrarily arresting and murdering in their infamous paseos. Other anarchist patrols practiced expropriations. Josep Tarradellas, as Companys' right hand, was determined to unify the security forces in Catalonia under one command and to finish with the Patrullas de Control. On 26 March, Tarradellas banned members of the police from having political affiliation and demanded for all political organizations to hand over their weapons. Thus, anarchists withdrew from the government of the Generalitat of Catalonia. The open crisis forced Companys to give in to their demands, anarchists retained their weapons, and the Control Patrols remained in place.

On 25 April, a force of Carabineros forced patrols of CNT in Puigcerdà to hand over control of the customs house. Juan Negrín, the Finance Minister, had resolved to end the anomaly under which the CNT controlled that important border. Puigcerdá had become a center of espionage, falsification of passports and clandestine leakage. Its mayor, Antonio Martin, insisted on general collectivization but raised his own livestock. After a violent confrontation occurred, he and several of his men were killed. Negrín then found it easier to gain control over the other customs posts.

The Guardia Nacional Republicana and the Guardia de Asalto ("Assault Guards") were sent to Figueras and other cities in northern Catalonia to replace CNT patrols. In Barcelona, fear began of an outbreak of open warfare between the anarchists and the POUM against the government and the communists. Each side formed weapon caches and secretly fortified its buildings in for fear that its rivals would attack it first.

The tense calm continued for one week. May Day, traditionally a day of celebration, was spent in silence, as the UGT and the CNT agreed to suspend their parades, which inevitably would have caused riots.

Opposing sides 
Three main political forces were involved in the events that led to the May Days. Although all parties had as main objective winning the war, the CNT, the Libertarian Youth, and the POUM and other minor groups like the anarchist Friends of Durruti Group or the Trotskyist Bolshevik-Leninist Section of Spain had a clear revolutionary motivation. The participation of these groups in the war, which was decisive in the opening events of the war, was motivated by the defense of the revolution and not the Republic. The Unified Socialist Party of Catalonia (PSUC) considered a revolutionary approach inappropriate without winning the war first.

There were also groups with other political affiliations that were inclined to return to the Republican legality, the authorities of the Republican Government in Valencia and the Generalitat. They forged an alliance with the aforementioned PSUC and the Republican Left of Catalonia. A third sector was composed by the "possibilist" sector of the CNT, supporting an immediate termination of hostilities between both sides. Although the PSUC was not a bourgeois party, from the point of view of the Republican authorities it presented itself as an alternative to the revolutionary chaos, and it advocated for the strengthening of central government that would replace the local committees. To get this done, they proposed a centrally organized and instructed army, led by a single command. Orwell summarized the PSUC-party line as follows:

On the position of the POUM, shared by most of the more radical anarchists, like the Friends of Durruti, Orwell states:

Chronology

Preliminary events 
Since the beginning of the Spanish Civil War, the telephone exchange had been controlled by the CNT-UGT labor union committee, which had collectivized the telephone companies in the geographical areas it controlled, with a government delegation stationed in the building that crucially controlled Catalan telephone communications.

On 2 May, the Minister of Marine and Air, Indalecio Prieto, telephoned the Generalitat from Valencia. An anarcho-syndicalist telephonist on the other side replied that in Barcelona there was no government, only a Defense Committee. The government was convinced that anarchists were recording their telephone conversations since they, of course, had the means to do so. The same day, there was a call from President Manuel Azaña to Companys, President of the Generalitat. During the conversation, it was cut by the operator, who said that the lines should be used for more important purposes than a mere talk between presidents. For some time, Republican authorities had been suspecting that anarcho-syndicalists controlled all official telephone conversations, and such incidents were the last straw.

The same afternoon, on 2 May, shots were exchanged between members of Estat Català and the FAI in Barcelona, killing a member of the latter.

3 May 
A force of 200 police officers, commanded by the Minister of Public Order of the Government of Catalonia, Eusebio Rodríguez Salas, went to the Telefónica central exchange and presented itself at the censorship department located on the second floor, with the intention of taking control of the building. The anarchists saw that as a provocation since Telefónica was legally occupied by an anarcho-syndicalist committee, according to a decree on collectivization from the Generalitat itself. Rodríguez Salas, on his part, had authorization from the head of internal affairs of the regional government, Artemi Aiguader i Miró. The anarchist workers opened fire from the second-floor landing of the censorship department. Salas phoned in for help, with a company of the National Republican Guard arriving along with two Control Patrols heads, Dionisio Eroles (of the anarchist police station) and José Asens (of the Control Patrols). Eroles persuaded the CNT workers to cease fire; although they resisted at first, they surrendered their weapons, not before shooting through the windows to empty their ammunition.

A crowd gathered in Plaça Catalunya, and at first, it was believed that the anarchists had captured the head of the police. The POUM, the Friends of Durruti Group, the Bolshevik-Leninists and the Libertarian Youth took positions, and after a few hours, all of the political parties had taken out the weapons that they had hidden and began building barricades. From that skirmish, battles began in different parts of the city. Several hundred barricades were built, and police units occupied roofs and church towers.

The PSUC and the government controlled the urban sectors situated at the east side of the Ramblas. Anarchists dominated the western sectors and all the suburbs. In the city centre, where the headquarters of trade unions and political parties (installed in requisitioned buildings and hotels) were relatively close, shooting began, and cars circulating were machine-gunned. In the Telefónica building, a truce was agreed to, and telephone communications, which were essential for war operations, were not interrupted. The police, installed on the first floor, even sent bocadillos to the anarchists, who occupied the upper floors. However, from the rooftops, various grenades blew up several police cars. Early in the evening, the leaders of the POUM proposed to the Barcelona anarchist leaders the formation of an alliance against the communists and the government. The anarchists refused immediately.

4 May 
On 4 May, Barcelona was a city plunged into silence, interrupted only by the fire of rifles and machine guns. Shops and buildings were covered by barricades. Anarchist armed groups attacked the barracks of the Assault Guards and government buildings. The government and communist militias responded fire. Most of the Barcelona proletariat supported the anarcho-syndicalists, and fears started over a Civil War inside the Civil War. At eleven o'clock, the delegates of the CNT met and agreed to do everything possible to restore calm. Meanwhile, the anarchists Joan García Oliver and Federica Montseny launched an appeal on the radio to ask their followers to lay down their weapons and return to their jobs. Jacinto Toryho, the director of the CNT newspaper Solidaridad Obrera, expressed the same sentiment. Anarchist ministers arrived in Barcelona, and with them were Mariano Rodríguez Vázquez "Marianet" (secretary of the national committee of the CNT), Pascual Tomás and Carlos Hernández (from the executive committee of the UGT). None of them wanted a confrontation with the communists, and President Francisco Largo Caballero had no desire to use force against the anarchists. Federica Montseny later said that the news of the riots had caught her and the other anarchist ministers totally unprepared.

On the Aragon front, units of the 26th Anarchist Division (former Durruti Column) under the command of Gregorio Jover, gathered in Barbastro to march on Barcelona. However, upon hearing the García Oliver radio broadcast, they remained in their positions. Meanwhile, the 28th Division (former Ascaso Column) and the 29th Division of the POUM, commanded by Rovira, didn't cancel their proposed march on Barcelona until the head of the Republican Air Force in the Aragon front, Alfonso Reyes, threatened to bomb them if they pressed on with their plan.

By five o'clock in the afternoon, several anarchists were killed by the police near the Via Durruti (current Via Laietana). The POUM began to support resistance publicly. In shootings occurring that day, the well-known libertarian Domingo Ascaso, relative of Francisco Ascaso and president of the Regional Council of Defense of Aragon Joaquín Ascaso, was killed. The Bolshevik-Leninist Section of Spain, an official group of the Fourth International in Spain, distributed on the barricades of Barcelona leaflets, "Long life to the revolutionary offensive", which included the following statement:

5 May 
Inside the Generalitat, Tarradellas, backed by Companys, still resisted the resignation of Artemi Ayguadé, which was demanded by the Anarchists. In the end, a solution was reached and Companys achieved a fragile truce between the different groups. To satisfy the anarchists' demands, the Catalan government would resign and form a new one without Ayguadé that would represent Anarchists, ERC, PSUC and Unió de Rabassaires. However, uncontrollable shootings still swept through the streets of Barcelona and caused the death of those who had ventured to leave their shelters. At 9:30 the Assault Guard attacked the seat of the doctors' trade union in Santa Ana Square, in central Barcelona, and the headquarters of the local FIJL. Anarchists denounced government complicity and Soviet interests in that attack on the social revolution in Catalonia. The Friends of Durruti Group published various leaflets demanding the release of Francisco Maroto del Ojo, an Andalusian anarchist who had recently been jailed, and asking people to resist. In one of them, it declared:

A Revolutionary Junta has been constituted in Barcelona. All the culprits of the coup d'etat, that operate under the protection of the government, will be executed. The POUM will be a member of the Junta because they support workers.

Nevertheless, both the CNT-FAI and the FIJL refused to take part in the initiative of that group. At about five o'clock, the anarchist authors Camillo Berneri and Francesco Barbieri were arrested by a group of twelve guards, six of them members of the local police and the rest from the PSUC. Both were murdered during their arrest. The climate of alarm worsened when British destroyers arrived at the port. The POUM feared that a bombardment would begin. In fact, the British feared that anarchists would take control of the situation, and talks occurred on evacuating foreign subjects from the city. At night, Federica Montseny, Minister of Health and an important member of the CNT, arrived with the purpose of mediating between all of the parties. The Communist Antonio Sesé, General Secretary of the Catalan UGT and a member of the Generalitat's new provisional council, died in a gunfight on his way to receive his new appointment.

The same day, combat occurred in Tarragona and other coastal towns. There too, the Assault Guard proceeded to oust the CNT from the telephone exchanges they had occupied. Similar actions in Tortosa and Vic resulted in a final death toll of 30 anarchists in Tarragona and another 30 in Tortosa. At night, Lluis Companys and then Prime Minister Francisco Largo Caballero held a telephone conversation in which the Catalan President accepted the Spanish government's offer of assistance for restoring order.

6 May 
At dawn, the CNT once again asked the workers to return to their work to no avail although more out of fear than out of obstinacy. In the afternoon, however, combat resumed. Various members of the National Republican Guard died in a cinema after a shelling from a 75 mm artillery cannon, carried from the coast by some members of the Libertarian Youth.

A force of about 5,000, most of them Assault Guards, departed from Madrid and Valencia towards Barcelona. Two Republican destroyers and the battleship Jaime I, coming from Valencia, reached the port of Barcelona that night.

7 May 
At 8:20, the expedition of the Assault Guards reached Barcelona and occupied different points of the city. Some came by road from Valencia after they had suppressed the revolts in Tarragona and Reus. Local anarchists had bombed bridges, roads and railways to prevent the passage of the column. That day, the CNT called again for a return to work by proclaiming on the radio, "Down the barricades! Each citizen takes its paving stone! Let's return to normality!" The expeditionary forces that entered Barcelona were under the command of Lieutenant Colonel Emilio Torres, who enjoyed certain sympathy from anarchists. His assignment was proposed by the CNT to promote the return to normality. Assault Guards in Barcelona, Tarragona and many other cities proceeded to disarm and arrest numerous members of the CNT, FAI, Libertarian Youth and POUM who had taken part in the riots.

8 May 
The streets returned to normality despite some isolated incidents, and the suppression of barricades began. The unrest in Barcelona had finally finished. The contemporary press estimated the death toll of 500 dead and 1,000 injured. The May Days had secondary actions in many towns, mainly in the provinces of Barcelona and Tarragona. The fight was strong there too but ended with the defeat of the anarchists and Trotskyists.

Aftermath 
The May Days had profound and long consequences. They showed that anarchists would not act with a single voice, unlike on 18 July 1936. A gap opened between the anarchist ministers, who were absorbed with winning the war, and the anarchist youth, who were above all obsessed by the triumph of the revolution. Also, very influential personalities like Escorza or García Oliver had lost control over their own followers. The crisis showed that there could be no truce between communists and the POUM. The Generalitat of Catalonia was restored to its old functions with the entry of one representative of the UGT (the communist Vidiella), one of the CNT (Valerio Mas) and one of ERC (again Tarradellas). Some of those responsible for the killings were tried later but only in Tarragona, and they were sentenced not to death but only to imprisonment.

The Generalitat of Catalonia, the communists and the central government seemed willing to act together against extremists by force, if necessary. The new Director of Public Order in Barcelona, José Echevarria Novoa, soon restored normality in much of the judicial system, but in that way, the communists could take more easily their crusade against the POUM. The republican authorities took no more measures against the CNT and the FAI because of their still-great power and their high level of popular support. The POUM situation was quite different, as the republican government soon outlawed the party, on 16 June, and arrested its main leaders, including Julián Gorkin and Andreu Nin. The POUM would disappear, and the anarchists would never intervene in the war as before. Ultimately, the internal disputes tore the republic apart and were a burden on its internal unity against the rebels.

Other consequences were the fall of the Government of the Victory, led by Largo Caballero and the departure of the four anarchist ministers that were represented in it. It was also clear victory of communist influence and power in the Spanish Republicans.

In popular culture 
The May Days were reflected in different works written by international participants in the Spanish Civil War. George Orwell's 1938 autobiographical Homage to Catalonia was one of the first works written about the events. The English writer had been a first-hand witness of the events in Barcelona, as he had served in the POUM militias. Similarly, the events are also mentioned in Ted Allan's 1939 novel This Time a Better Earth, which was based on Allan's experiences in Spain. Orwell's work is sympathetic to the POUM, but Allan's novel depicts the perspective that Popular Front members had towards the POUM during the May Days.

The May Days were also represented in Spanish works like the novel La plaça del Diamant (The Diamond Square) by the Catalan writer Mercè Rodoreda, which was published in 1962, a work on the history of Natalia, a girl from Barcelona who lives during the Civil War. A film adaptation, The Time of the Doves, was made in 1982. Directed by Francesc Betriu, it is a faithful representation of the novel.

Films which portray the May Days events of Barcelona include Memorias del general Escobar (Memories of General Escobar), directed by José Luis Madrid and released in 1984 which tells the story of General Antonio Escobar Huertas and his role during the Spanish Civil War and the Barcelona Events, and In 1995, the English film director Ken Loach's 1995 film Land and Freedom, loosely inspired by Orwell's work.

The Spanish Netflix drama Cable Girls (2017) also portrays a dramatization of events of the May Days but is set in Madrid, instead of Barcelona.

See also 

 List of Spanish Republican military equipment of the Spanish Civil War
Anarcho-syndicalism

Notes

References

Bibliography
 Aguilera Povedano, Manuel. Compañeros y camaradas. Las luchas entre antifascistas en la Guerra Civil Española. Editorial Actas. Madrid, 2012. 
 La guerra civil mes a mes, Tomo 13. Los sucesos de Barcelona (Mayo de 1937), varios autores, Grupo Unidad Editorial S.A., 2005  (obra completa)  (Tomo 13).

External links
 Documents on Barcelona May Days, 1937 from "Trabajadores: The Spanish Civil War Through the Eyes of Organised Labour," Modern Records Centre, University of Warwick.
 The May Days: Barcelona 1937, Freedom Press, 1987.
 Felix Morrow, Revolution and Counter Revolution in Spain, ch. 10
 Pierre Broué, "The ‘May Days’ of 1937 in Barcelona"

1937 in Spain
Spanish Civil War
Spanish Revolution of 1936
Anarchism in Spain
History of anarchism
History of Barcelona
History of Catalonia
POUM
Urban warfare